Daniel Bryan may refer to:

 Bryan Danielson (born 1981), American professional wrestler who formerly used the ring name "Daniel Bryan"
 Dan Bryan (1900–1985), Irish soldier
 Daniel Bryan (Big Brother), contestant on the British reality television show Big Brother
 Daniel Bryan (Virginia politician) (1789–1866), American politician
 Daniel Bryan Harvey, American musician
 Danny Bryant (born 1980), English musician